Sugar Rush is a cancelled massively multiplayer online game from Klei Entertainment. It was the first game to be developed in North America to be released by Nexon, before it was announced that it would no longer be published.

Gameplay
During beta testing players could be a ninja, brawler or morph. The main object of the game was to get the most coins, gained by battling other players. There were four games that could be played. The first one was Robot Battle in which a team of up to four players fight robots which respawn; the difficulty could be adjusted to four different strengths.

Development

Sugar Rush was developed in Vancouver by Klei Entertainment. In May 2008, when Min Kim, Nexon's director of game operations, was interviewed at Ten Ton Hammer he stated that a game was in development in a Vancouver Studio.

The Second Closed Beta for Sugar Rush started on the November 20, 2008, and finished on the December 4, 2008.  However, Nexon closed its North American development studio, Humanature in March 2009 and the future of Sugar Rush has been in question since then. The only information provided about the game's future's was a message posted on the developer's blog on by Klei Entertainment CEO Jamie Cheng.  According to Cheng, "Since the shutdown of Nexon Publishing North America, there has been a ton of inquiries regarding the fate of Sugar Rush.  Nexon has been amazingly great to work with during the difficult transition, and the current result is that Klei has retained the rights to Sugar Rush, and remain committed to the title.

In July 2009, Nexon announced they would be closing the Sugar Rush website, as they would no longer be the publishers for the game. As stated by Klei entertainment, Sugar Rush "will see the light of day", although not being published by Nexon America.  It was announced by Klei Entertainment in late August 2010, that development of Sugar Rush had stopped and the game was cancelled.

References

External links 
 Klei Entertainment's Sugar Rush site

Cancelled Windows games
Massively multiplayer online games
Nexon games
Video games developed in Canada
Klei Entertainment games
Inactive massively multiplayer online games
Windows games